Homona fistulata is a species of moth of the family Tortricidae. It is found in Australia, where it has been recorded from Queensland.

The moth is about 14 mm for males and 16.5 mm for females.

References

Moths described in 1910
Homona (moth)